La Gloria is a town in the municipality of Perote in the Mexican state of Veracruz. As of the 2005 population survey, it had a population of 2,243 (1092 men and 1151 women).

The town is located in Perote Valley and is surrounded by mountains. Its altitude of  makes it one of the highest areas of the state of Veracruz. It is connected to Perote by a small highway; there, the small highway intersects Federal Highway 140, which goes to Xalapa.

Many residents have protested the pig farming operation.

La Gloria is suspected to be the place where the 2009 swine flu pandemic originated.

References

Populated places in Veracruz